is a Japanese manga series by Miyuki Abe based on the epic novel series Nansō Satomi Hakkenden. An anime adaptation of the manga, produced by Studio Deen, premiered on January 5, 2013. A second season premiered in summer of 2013.

Plot
Five years prior to the start of the story the residents of Ōtsuka village all died in a plague, with only three survivors; Shino Inuzuka, Sosuke Inukawa and Hamaji. They take shelter in a church near another village, whose people views the survivors with suspicion. Now the Imperial Church comes in search of "Murasame," the demon blade containing "life" which Shino possesses within his body. When the Church realizes that Shino will not come quietly with them, Hamaji is kidnapped, which results in Shino and Sosuke traveling to the Imperial City to rescue her. There they encounter Satomi Rio, a Dean of the Church, who tells Shino he must find the other six bead holders.

Characters

The bead holders
 There are eight bead holders all together, representing the eight young men who appeared with Princess Fuse to fight Tama-Azusa in "the time of darkness". Shino and Sosuke have been charged with gathering together the bead holders for some reason by Rio. So far all the bead holders have five things in common; they all have a bead, a peony mark somewhere on their bodies, "Inu" at the beginning of their last names, they've all died and come back to life, and they all have a guardian or ability that is keeping them alive.

 An 18-year-old boy who is the holder of the "Devotion" （孝） bead. Nicknamed 'Shii' by Kaname, he is one of the three survivors of the destruction of Ōtsuka Village. He holds the living sword Murasame in his right arm, along with a peony birthmark. Because of a curse set by harboring Murasame within his body, he is still in his 13-year-old state. Five years before the start of the story, Shino was a very weak and ill child who was made to dress and act like a girl by his parents because they heard doing so would help him grow. Young Shino was told that he would not live into adulthood. He still openly welcomed Sosuke and Hamaji into his home and treated the two abandoned children as brother and sister. Shino even commented that he and Sosuke are brothers when he sees Sosuke's peony mark. Though mentally 18, he does tend to act like his status age, something Sosuke is constantly teasing and lecturing him about. He often has outbursts of emotion, is very energetic and loud yet has a very kind, naïve, and loving nature. Because of this many people are attracted to him, including spirits and humans. He easily makes friends with many people, is usually straight forward, talking or taking action without thinking, which typically concludes with a scolding from Sosuke. He seems quite perplexed by the fact that Genpachi has shown a romantic interest in him, again pointing to his age and naivety. He cares deeply for those around him, to such an extent that he forced Sosuke to continue living after they were fatally injured five years ago. Although his exterior personality is happy and optimistic, he reveals himself to be quite burdened and knowledgeable of the events taking place around him; this is often seen when his thoughts travel to his immortality. He is shown to have a deep fear of the possibility of living alone one day. Shino loves meat, and he is petrified of the living dead and insects, and is usually seen running away or clinging to Sosuke in fear when either appear. Despite his phobias, when he needs to fight he shows great bravery and is calmer, especially with Murasame in hand. Shino often wears a red and white long coat with the church insignia on the back and has short purple hair and greenish yellow eyes. He is revealed to be the younger half brother of Satomi Rio.

 The holder of the Duty （義） bead. He is another of the three survivors, along with Shino and Hamaji. He can shape shift into the dog Yoshiro, who had been Shino's loyal pet, and has a peony mark on the back of his neck. He treats Shino and Hamaji like family, as he does not have any relatives. He is very strict on safety and tends to be the calm and composed one to Shino's brash and compulsive behavior. He is also very protective of Shino and often volunteers to pay the prices for his deeds, as seen when he was willing to pay the price of having his arm cut off in order to protect Shino when he trespassed into Chikage's house. He is constantly by Shino's side and tends to spend half his time bailing him out of trouble. A mysterious man who looks identical to him, Ao (who was referred to as Sosuke's 'shadow' by Murasame) is said to be the other half of Sosuke's soul. He has a very kind and gentle personality, and is a very hard worker. He would not hesitate even to kill someone if it were for Shino's benefit. When he was a child, Mayor Inuzuka of Otsuka, Shino's father, found him and his mother collapsed by the road. They were taken in, but his mother died, and he lost all his memories of what happened before then. Sosuke dresses in black attire that is similar to a school uniform and has short black hair and blue eyes. In episode 24, he lost his sense of pain, use of his left hand and sight in his left eye, and is in a comatose state. In Episode 13 of season 2, he wakes out of his coma due to Shino's wish for the bead to choose him again.

 Holder of the Faith（信）bead. He is a captain of the Imperial Military Police. Three years ago, he and his foster brother, Kobungo, were sent on assignment to the north and were attacked by demons. As a result of the incident, he can turn into a lightning demon that devours supernatural beings. He and Kobungo's sister Nui were lovers before he left and she had committed suicide when he returned because she was pregnant by another man. This caused much grief to Genpachi and, as a result, he tried to commit suicide as well. However, he failed each and every time due to his now-demonic body. He has a peony mark on his right cheek. He has feelings for Shino because he believes Shino is someone that won't die easily unlike Nui, and he doesn't care if Shino is male. Genpachi is a quiet person who often seems to give very little care to details. As a Captain of the Imperial Military Police, Genpachi is seen to take his work very seriously. He demonstrate an ability to keep his thoughts and emotions in check which allows him to be very efficient at his job.

 Holder of the Brotherhood（悌）bead. He works at an inn owned by his family. He was a foot soldier who accompanied Genpachi on a mission in a Northern village. The mission took a turn for the worse when he and Genpachi were attacked by man-eating demons, but he found after the incident that he could transform into a wind demon at will. Like Genpachi, his wounds heal very easily. He has a peony mark on his lower back. Kobungo is a very excitable person, which is shown when Genpachi says that Shino is "his type". He is also very stubborn and cares deeply for those around him, constantly trying to get Genpachi out of confinement.

 Holder of the Wisdom（智）bead. A traveling dancer who accompanies Kokonoe. Two years before the start of the series, Ao destroyed his village, killed his family, and carved out his heart, but Keno had refused to die, a fact that fascinated the demon princess Kokonoe. When he first met Sosuke, he attacked him, thinking he was the person who attacked his village. He is feminine in appearance, but is an adept swordsman, and is quite strong. He has a peony mark on his chest. He possesses a sword named Osaza, which his father entrusted to him.

 Holder of the Loyalty（忠）Bead. A man who was saved from freezing to death by the snow spirit, Yukihime, He is searching for his long lost sister, Mutsuki, who was separated from him when they were both young about ten years after their parents had passed away. He has a peony mark. He first met Shino and Sousuke on the train when he was searching for his sister, where Shino recognized Yukihime. He tends to be freaked out over anything supernatural like Murasame coming out of Shino's arm, and is often told by the other characters that he has the worst luck. When he and Mutsuki were separated, he promised her to come back and find her eventually, and she gave him her hair pin. Dosetsu has purple hair because of a medicine he used to take when he was a child, meant to help him develop an immunity to various drugs. He is often seen wearing a tan trench coat and glasses.

 Holder of the Etiquette（礼）bead. The adopted son of a doll maker; he was given to his current family by his real father, who was looking for an easy way to get money by selling his son in return for dolls he could sell. Daikaku is also a doll maker and wished to follow in his adopted father's footsteps, even when he admits that he will never be as good as his adopted father. After his adopted father had died, his real father had come looking for him so that he could make more dolls to sell, and when Daikaku refused, his father killed him. Daikaku was saved by Noro, his deceased pet cat that had come back to protect him as a spirit. It is later revealed that Noro had also put up a spirit barrier to keep the now tainted spirit of Daikaku's adopted father from entering. He has a younger sister named Hinaginu. He eventually receives a third eye on his forehead that sees and exterminates spirits, which was a gift from his late cat, Noro.

 Holder of the Benevolence（仁）bead. A young boy around 12 years of age. When he was 6, his mother attempted to kill him, but he was saved by Kagetsu, a Tengu who later took care of him and eventually entrusted half of his life to the boy. After 10 years, he was found by Chudai, who then left him under his grandmother's care. Because he spent 10 years as a Tengu child, he stopped aging until his rescue by Chudai, making him chronologically 22 years old. He meets Shino and Sosuke during their investigation of a spirit child's sudden return, and is later taken back by Kagetsu's brother Hazuki. It is also revealed by Hazuki that Shinobu is actually Kagetsu's son, making him half Tengu. During Ao's attack on their home, Shinobu discovers his bead, which had been hidden in his body by Kagetsu. Sent away to safety by Hazuki after healing the boy with half of his life, Shinobu eventually learns to use his Tengu wings to help Shino put out a forest fire. Afterwards, he decides to join Shino and Sosuke on their way back to the Imperial Capital. He has a peony mark on his left arm.

Four Sacred Beast Houses
 The  are the fox, the wolf, the snake, and the panther. The wielders of the Sacred Beasts are very powerful and tend to be feared, which is why the Church chose to take them in; so that they could control them. The wielders also tend to be ostracized by their families, even being called disgraces, so they are usually alone except for each other. They live in a huge mansion, which they end up sharing with Shino and Sosuke.

 One of the members of the "Four Sacred Beast Houses", he materializes his spirit in form of an Okami (a giant white wolf) named Yatsufusa. He is the one who saved Shino, Sosuke, and Hamaji during the destruction of Ōtsuka Village. He asks Sosuke and Shino to find the other bead holders for an unknown purpose. Rio volunteered to be Shino's guardian. It was hinted that he is related to Shino, later revealed to be Shino's older half brother. It is also hinted that he may have known Shino before the incident and was the one who gave Murasame to Shino in order to save his life.

 One of the members of the "Four Sacred Beast Houses", he is capable of summoning five foxes to use them as servants or fighters. He seems to have feelings for Hamaji, as in episode 4, he told his older brother that he didn't care about his family, or about what his brother did, but that by injuring Hamaji's face he had crossed the line. He is constantly teasing Rio and was the one who gave Shino his nickname. He was cast out of his family for being a 'disgrace' after he was discovered to be the wielder of the fox spirits.

 One of the members of the "Four Sacred Beast Houses", she summons her guardian spirit in the form of giant snake named Chikage. She becomes friends with Hamaji. She is physically very weak and because of that only her connection with Chikage is keeping her alive, which results in Chikage being extremely protective of her. However, since Chikage is the size of a 'guardian god' now he can not leave the house, which limits Ayane's movements as well. It was later realized that Ayane could use Kaname's foxes to travel, however.

 One of the members of the "Four Sacred Beast Houses", he is capable of summoning a large black panther called Kaede. He tends to have a laid back personality, but can be serious when he wants to. He seems to be privy to Rio's secrets and tends to act in the shadows, and takes his time on when on missions. Kaede doesn't like the House too much, saying it's much too crowded with all the other Beasts there.

Familiars

 Murasame is the living sword spirit, rumored to have sway over anything regardless of shape or form. It is said that whoever possess Murasame will meet a tragic end. The spirit can transform into a crow and can communicate in human language. Murasame sometimes sits on Shino's arm and likes to pick and eat dropped food, as well as Megu, which Shino has scolded him for. However, when in his true form or angry, Murasame becomes a blood-thirsty monster, resembling that of a dragon. He is also very obedient to Shino. Whenever Murasame is out, he has a tendency to accidentally crash into nearby barriers and break them. Although Murasame is often somewhat klutzy, it has been shown to have a serious, and more aggressive side to it, morphing into a gigantic dinosaur form when overprotective of Shino. It is sometimes shown to be watching Shino from a distance and has the ability to summon rain.

 The demon princess that saved Keno from death after the destruction of his village and almost be killed by Ao, giving him her heart so that he could live.

 The snow spirit that saved Dōsetsu from death at the cost of her voice and always accompanies him making everywhere around him cold, even during summer. She refers to Shino as her only true friend and constantly wards off other women Dosetsu gets close to with her powers.

 Daikaku's late pet cat who hands down his cat's eye to him.

 A Tengu who saved Shinobu from death. He is eventually revealed as Shinobu's biological father. He gave half of his life to Shinobu, and as a result died due to using his remaining powers.

 Kagetsu's twin brother who only reluctantly accepted Shinobu's presence at first. He then retrieves Shinobu and tells him of Kagetsu's fate. After awakening Shinobu's powers by giving half of his life to the boy, he dies at Ao's hands and becomes a lifeless vessel for his plans.

 A dog-like beast and a close friend of Kagetsu and Hazuki, who becomes Shinobu's aide after they both die. After staying at Konaya, he takes a liking to kotatsu.

 Rio's Inugami.






 Kaname's identical foxes who serve as his maids. They can shapeshift into humans but remain the same size.

 Ayane's serpent who is overprotective of her to the point that Ayane obeys her.

 Nachi's panther who can change size. He is infatuated with Nachi and sometimes feels neglected with the other familiars around him.

Antagonists

 Known as Sosuke's Shadow and said to be the other half of Sosuke's soul, not much is known about him other than the fact that he appears to be rather malicious and unpredictable and that he was given a body by Fusehime. He appears to possess Sosuke's missing childhood memories, a fact which he likes to remind Shino of. He was the one who killed Keno and took his heart and received a slash to his left eye in return. He also possesses the Ochiba sword, which is the sibling sword of Keno's Osaza sword, and claims in episode 17 that both swords were meant to be his, and that it was Keno's parents who had destroyed his village. He seems infatuated with Shino, even stating at one point that he would come for him, but that it was not yet time because the owners of the beads were not yet 'gathered'. This is supported by the fact that he took Kohaku's left eye after finding out that Shino liked her eyes, as well as the fact that he's been keeping tabs on Shino's life. Ao has the same face as Sosuke, and dresses in a dark shirt, light pants, and a green cloak. He has black hair and heterochromia, one blue one gold. He once lost his left eye so he stole that of Kohaku in exchange for cursing her life.

 According to legend, Tamazusa was a princess who attempted to enter Japan with her two sons. The younger one left to join the government and was killed. Afterwards, her elder son committed suicide upon learning of his younger brother's demise. She was also the model Daikaku's adopted father hired for one of his larger dolls, recognized by Shino as the woman who once "killed" him. She reappears in episode 25, under the disguise of a nun, and working with Ao to gather all eight beads in order to bring her sons back. She is last seen escaping after Murasame goes on rampage and her whereabouts are unknown.

Others

 A psychotic monk who attempts to kill Genpachi, because he believes that Genpachi's demon form is a threat to humans. He is Kaname's older brother and is killed by him in episode 4.

 A girl who survived the Ōtsuka Village incident. She is like a sister to Shino and Sosuke. She always obsesses over making sure that everyone is fed properly, although she is not a very good cook. She is manipulative towards the boys, but deep down she cares about them. She states in episode 9 that she wants to be a doctor so that she can help alleviate Shino's suffering as he cannot age. It is revealed that she is Dousetsu Inuyama's long lost sister, . She seems to have feelings for Kaname. She is also not easily disturbed, as shown when she was kidnapped by Osaki and remained unperturbed. In episode 9, she starts attending an all-girls boarding school.

 A black algae-like creature with an eyeball that Shino found in episode 1. When he becomes wet or eats too much, his size increases dramatically, making him useful in certain situations. Murasame constantly attempts to eat him, only to be scolded by Shino. He has been living in the Konna-ya ever since Shino and Sosuke's arrival at the Imperial Capital. He got his name from Genpachi after he took an interest in the creature. He also has a habit of chewing on anything he considers edible, such as Kaede's tails, only to be chided by either Kobungo or Kaede.

 

 Hamaji's best friend and roommate at school. She actually revealed to be the "guardian" who watches over the boarding school and whose real appearance is a half teddy bear and half rabbit ("Rabbear"). Her human form has orange hair, peach colored skin, and yellow eyes.

 

 Known as "Ruri the perfect" is a popular student at Hamaji's boarding school.

 

 Shino and Sousuke's rebellious neighbor who resides in the village part of town. He refers to Sosuke as "Bro-so".

 A monk who is obsessed with exterminating spirits. He is later revealed to be a father figure to Shinobu after saving him from Kagetsu.

 A prostitute from the red light district who was raised as such as being taken away from her family. Ao grants her wish of extending her life at the cost of her left eye, which he wears, and in return gives her the ability to turn into a demon and devour others. She requests Shino to execute her to put an end to her suffering.

 A blind little girl who goes to school along with a few other children at the local church. She enjoys Shino reading books for her despite not being able to see.

 A miko who was cursed by Ao after being desperate to see the outside world. After Yana is freed from her, she attends the same boarding school as Hamaji.

One of Shinobu and Shino's classmates at Ikura Public School. Growing up as an only child of a working-class family, he lived with his physically ill mother  and his mentally stressed father . Wanting to help his mother, he went to the mountains to pick bellflowers for her. However, he fell from the mountains and died in the flowerfields. After he passed away, the bellflowers gave Akihiko half-life for his desire, which was that he wanted to give flowers to his mother and see her one last time.

Media

Anime
The anime premiered on MBS on January 5, 2013. The series is directed by Mitsue Yamazaki, with Osamu Yamazaki as Chief Director. The anime has been licensed by Sentai Filmworks in North America and by Hanabee in Australia & New Zealand. The series had been obtained by Crunchyroll for online streaming in North America. Season 2 began airing on July 7, 2013. The opening theme song for the first season is called "God FATE" and is performed by Faylan, while the ending theme song is called "String of pain" and is sung by Tetsuya Kakihara. For the second season, the opening theme song is called "wonder fang" by Faylan, while the ending theme is called  by Ceui.

Episode list

Season 1

Season 2

See also
 Super Lovers, another manga by the same author

References

External links
 Official anime website
 

2005 manga
2013 anime television series debuts
Anime series based on manga
Bandai Visual
Kadokawa Shoten manga
Kadokawa Dwango franchises
Mainichi Broadcasting System original programming
Sentai Filmworks
Supernatural anime and manga
Shōjo manga
Studio Deen
Tokyo MX original programming
Yōkai in anime and manga